Arachnophilia is a source code editor written in Java by Paul Lutus. It is the successor to another HTML editor, WebThing. The name Arachnophilia comes from the term meaning "love of spiders", a metaphor for the task of building on the World Wide Web.

Arachnophilia is free and open-source software subject to the terms of the GNU General Public License.

History 
Once written as a Windows application, the program was rewritten by Lutus in Java as part of his boycott against Microsoft and its product activation features for Windows XP. Arachnophilia requires the Java 2 runtime environment, release 1.5 or later.

The program was licensed as Careware software, then as LGPL-2.1-or-later in 2011, and now as GPL-2.0-or-later since 2018 with the source available on the website.

Features 

The program can import and convert to HTML various RTF documents, tables and outlines from any Windows 95 (and above) compliant application. The output of the code can be previewed in up to six different web browsers. It supports CGI, frames and other languages beside HTML, for instance PHP, Perl, C++, Java, and JavaScript development.

Other features include:

 Multiple-document interface
 User-customizable toolbars
 Full drag and drop support
 Global search and replace
 Built-in FTP client
 Automatic uploading of files
 User-defined templates
 User-defined macros
 User-defined key bindings

See also
List of HTML editors
Comparison of HTML editors
Tech Spot on Arachnophilia
Private article on arachnophilia

Notes

References

External links
Arachnophilia Home Page

Free HTML editors
Free software programmed in Java (programming language)
Text editors programmed in Java
Software using the LGPL license
1996 software